Aliabad (also Romanized as ‘Alīābād) is a village in Howmeh Rural District, in the Central District of Abhar County, Zanjan Province, Iran. At the 2006 census, its population was 32, in 5 families.

References 

Populated places in Abhar County